Jaylon Smith (born June 14, 1995) is an American football linebacker for the New York Giants of the National Football League (NFL). He played college football at Notre Dame and was drafted 34th overall by the Dallas Cowboys in the second round of the 2016 NFL Draft.

High school career
Smith attended Bishop Luers High School in Fort Wayne, Indiana, where he was a letterman in football, basketball and track. In football, he won the Butkus Award as a senior, given to the best high school linebacker in the country, and was named the Mr. Football award winner for the state of Indiana.

He helped Bishop Luers to a 40–28 win over Indianapolis Cardinal Ritter in the 2012 Indiana 2A title game while rushing for 150 yards and scoring three touchdowns, as Bishop Luers became first Indiana 2A school to win four straight state titles. He finished with 1,265 rushing yards and 18 TDs on 176 attempts as senior in 2012 to go with 10 receptions for 66 yards and two more TDs. Defensively, he recorded 72 tackles (43 solo), 19.5 tackles for loss, eight sacks, two forced fumbles, one fumble recovery and seven pass deflections.

In basketball, he played as a freshman, sophomore and junior, and was teammates with former Ohio State basketball player Deshaun Thomas.

In track & field, Smith competed in events ranging from the relays to the shot put as a senior. At the 2013 IHSAA T&F Sectional, he took fourth in the shot put, with a PR of 14.81 meters (48 ft 6 in), and ran the lead leg on first-place 4 × 100 m (43.43) and fourth leg on second-place 4 × 400 m (3:27.08). At the 2013 SAC T&F Meet, he anchored the Bishop Luers' 4 × 100 m relay team, winning the event with a time of 42.91 seconds, and the 4 × 400 m, which finished in third place, while also placing third in the shot put (47 ft 5 in) and eight in the 400-meter dash (53.46 s).

Recruiting
Smith signed his letter of intent on February 6, 2013, and committed to attend and play football at the University of Notre Dame. He was considered the best outside linebacker recruit of his class by Rivals.com and Scout.com.  He played in the 2013 U.S. Army All-American Bowl.

College career

In 2013, Smith won the starting DOG linebacker position beating out Ben Councell, after incumbent starter Danny Spond had to retire due to migraine issues. Starting all 13 games, he recorded 67 tackles, including 6.5 for loss, one forced fumble, three pass break ups and one interception. His best game came in a 34–30 victory against Arizona State, where he recorded nine tackles, including 1.5 for loss. He notched his first career interception against USC on a pass thrown by Cody Kessler.

With the arrival of new defensive coordinator Brian VanGorder, he was moved to an inside linebacker position in 2014. He was one of three players to start all 13 games on defense, recording 112 tackles, including nine for loss, and 3.5 sacks, adding two pass breakups and one forced fumble. He was named the FBS Independent Co-Defensive Player of the Year, along with teammate Joe Schmidt IV and was named a second-team All-American by the Associated Press.

During his junior year in 2015, Smith played in all 13 games with 115 tackles, nine tackles for loss, one sack, five passes defended, two fumble recoveries, and 1 forced fumble. He won the Butkus Award, given annually to college football's top linebacker. During the Fiesta Bowl game against Ohio State, Smith suffered a knee injury in the first quarter and left the game. It was confirmed that the knee was diagnosed with tears to the ACL and LCL. He underwent successful knee surgery on both ligaments on January 7, 2016.  On January 11, 2016, Smith announced he would forego his remaining eligibility and enter the 2016 NFL draft.

College statistics

Professional career

Prior to his injury in the Fiesta Bowl, Smith was projected to be a top-five pick in the 2016 NFL Draft. On January 11, 2016, Smith released a statement through Twitter announcing his decision to forgo his remaining eligibility and enter the 2016 NFL Draft. Smith attended the NFL Scouting Combine in Indianapolis in order to meet with teams, but was unable to participate in workouts due to his injury. On April 14, 2016, Smith was one of multiple prospects to undergo extensive medical evaluations as multiple teams were worried about the possibility of nerve damage. He received tests to objectively measure his nerve function. Smith attended a pre-draft visit with the San Francisco 49ers. At the conclusion of the pre-draft process, NFL draft experts and scouts projected Smith to be selected as early as the second round to as late as the sixth round. The majority of NFL draft experts projected him to be a third or fourth round pick. He was ranked the 10th best outside linebacker prospect in the draft by DraftScout.com and was ranked the 11th best linebacker by NFL analyst Mike Mayock.

Dallas Cowboys

2016
The Dallas Cowboys selected Smith in the second round (34th overall) of the 2016 NFL Draft. The Cowboys selected Smith after they unsuccessfully tried to trade their second (34th overall) and third round (67th overall) draft choices to move back into the first round of the 2016 NFL Draft to select quarterback Paxton Lynch. The selection of Smith by the Dallas Cowboys surprised many observers and the media as they gambled on Smith's ability to return from his serious left knee injury he suffered in his last college game. Smith was operated on by the Dallas Cowboys’ doctor, Dan Cooper. Smith was the fourth linebacker drafted in 2016.

On May 20, 2016, the Dallas Cowboys signed Smith to a four-year, $6.49 million contract that includes $4.42 million guaranteed and a signing bonus of $2.92 million.

Jared Dubin, a CBS Sports writer, stated in an article posted to CBSSports.com on June 29, 2016, that "The Cowboys are confident in their diagnosis because it was their team physician that did Smith's surgery." He also went on to point out that, since the team's physician was the one to do the surgery, the Cowboys had more up-to-date information than other teams. Dubin then continued by saying that the Cowboys were in dire need of a superstar like Jaylon Smith, and that they could not afford to lose such a valuable prospect. As expected, Smith was inactive for the entire 2016 NFL season as he recovered from his torn ACL and MCL.

2017
On June 7, 2017, Smith participated in drills for the first time in front of media since his torn ACL and MCL. Smith entered training camp as a backup middle linebacker. On July 20, 2017, the Dallas Cowboys signed linebacker Justin Durant as insurance in the event Smith was unable to fully recover before the start of the regular season. Smith was expected to experience full nerve regeneration within the next six to nine months after suffering nerve damage as a result of his injury. On July 26, 2017, Smith took part in practice in full pads for the first time since college, but received limited reps as the coaching staff was cautious as he became acclimated to playing in full pads. The Dallas Cowboys planned to use Smith as a backup and rotational player primarily on first and second down to avoid putting him in pass situations. The plan to use him for 25–30 snaps per game was eventually scrapped after they were forced to use him more than expected after starting middle linebacker Anthony Hitchens suffered a tibial plateau fracture in the last preseason game. Head coach Jason Garrett named Smith the starting middle linebacker to begin the regular season, alongside outside linebackers Sean Lee and Damien Wilson.

He made his professional regular season debut and first career start in the Dallas Cowboys’ season-opener against the New York Giants and recorded seven combined tackles and forced a fumble during their 19–3 victory. In Week 4, he collected a season-high ten combined tackles (seven solo) during a 35–30 loss to the Los Angeles Rams. Smith remained as the starting middle linebacker in Weeks 4 and 5 after Anthony Hitchens was moved to outside linebacker to fill in for an injured Sean Lee. In Week 7, Smith was demoted to backup middle linebacker after Anthony Hitchens returned from injury. On October 22, 2017, Smith recorded three combined tackles and forced a fumble on his first career sack during the Cowboys’ 40–10 win at the San Francisco 49ers in Week 7. Smith made his first career sack on 49ers’ quarterback C. J. Beathard for a six-yard loss and also forced a fumble by Bethard that was recovered by teammate Tyrone Crawford in the third quarter. Smith finished his 2nd NFL season in 2017 with 81 combined tackles (50 solo), two pass deflections, two forced fumbles, and one sack in 16 games and six starts.

2018
Smith entered training camp slated as the starting middle linebacker after Anthony Hitchens departed for the Kansas City Chiefs during free agency. Head coach Jason Garrett named Smith the starting middle linebacker to start the regular season, ahead of rookie first round pick Leighton Vander Esch. He began the season alongside outside linebackers Sean Lee and Damien Wilson. On October 7, 2018, Smith collected 12 combined tackles (six solo), broke up a pass, and made a sack during a 19–16 loss at the Houston Texans in Week 5.

2019

On August 20, 2019, Smith signed a five-year, $64 million contract extension with the Cowboys with $35.5 million guaranteed, keeping him under contract through the 2024 season.

Smith was also elected as a first time team captain for the 2019 Dallas Cowboys season. In week 9 against the New York Giants on Monday Night Football, Smith recorded a team high 12 tackles and half a sack on Daniel Jones in the 37–18 win.
In week 10 against the Minnesota Vikings on Sunday Night Football, Smith recorded a team high 13 tackles in the 28–24 loss.
In week 17 against the Washington Redskins, Smith recorded a team high 8 tackles and intercepted a pass thrown by Case Keenum during the 47–16 win. This was Smith's first career interception in the NFL.

2020
In Week 2 against the Atlanta Falcons, Smith led the team with 13 tackles during the 40–39 come from behind win.
In Week 11 against the Minnesota Vikings, Smith recorded his first full sack of the season on Kirk Cousins during the 31–28 win.
In Week 12 against the Washington Football Team on Thanksgiving, Smith recorded his first interception off a pass thrown by Alex Smith and made a 43-yard return during the 41–16 loss.

2021
Earlier in the NFL offseason, he had wrist surgery in January. He also announced his decision to change his number from 54 to 9 from his college days, despite public backlash from some of the fan base, saying that the number belonged to former quarterback Tony Romo. It was reported in the media, that the change forced Smith to pay a mid-six figure sum, in order to buy back the existing inventory of jerseys and T-shirts with his old number.

On October 5, 2021, the Cowboys released Smith after he declined to waive his 2022 injury guarantee contract clause, to protect the team from a possible payment of 9.2 million dollars, and after he was passed on the depth chart by rookie Micah Parsons and veteran Keanu Neal. He appeared in 4 games with 2 starts during the season.

He finished his Cowboys career with 68 games, 516 tackles (20 for loss), 9 sacks, 2 interceptions, 6 forced fumbles and 5 fumble recoveries (including one returned for a touchdown).

Green Bay Packers
On October 7, 2021, Smith signed with the Green Bay Packers. On November 2, 2021, Smith was released. He appeared in two games, tallying one tackle in 27 defensive snaps.

New York Giants

2021 
On December 17, 2021, Smith signed with the New York Giants practice squad. On December 18, 2021, Smith was activated from the practice squad as a COVID-19 replacement for the game against the Dallas Cowboys. On December 20, 2021, Smith was promoted to the active roster.

2022
On September 20, 2022, Smith re-signed with the New York Giants to their practice squad. On October 1, 2022, he was promoted to the active roster.

NFL career statistics

Personal life
Jaylon has an older brother, Rod who is currently a free agent that has played for five NFL teams.

References

External links

Notre Dame Fighting Irish bio

1995 births
Living people
American football linebackers
Notre Dame Fighting Irish football players
Players of American football from Fort Wayne, Indiana
All-American college football players
Dallas Cowboys players
Green Bay Packers players
New York Giants players
National Conference Pro Bowl players
Ed Block Courage Award recipients